Luca Bramati (born 6 November 1968) is an Italian former cyclo-cross and cross-country mountain bike cyclist.

He most notably won the Cyclo-cross Superprestige and World Cup in the 1995–96 season. He also finished third in the 1996 and 1997 UCI Cyclo-cross World Championships, as well as third in the 1997 UCI Mountain Bike World Championships. Bramati also competed at the 1996 Summer Olympics in the Cross-country event.

Major results

1995
 2nd European Cross-Country Championships
1996
 1st Overall Superprestige
 1st Overall Cyclo-cross World Cup
 2nd National Cyclo-cross Championships
 3rd World Cyclo-cross Championships
 8th Cross-country, Summer Olympics
1997
 2nd European Cross-Country Championships
 2nd National Cyclo-cross Championships
 3rd World Cross-Country Championships
 3rd World Cyclo-cross Championships
 4th Overall Superprestige
 9th Overall Cyclo-cross World Cup
1999
 2nd National Cyclo-cross Championships
2001
 2nd National Cyclo-cross Championships
2002
 3rd National Cyclo-cross Championships
2003
 2nd National Cyclo-cross Championships

References

External links
 
 
 
 
 

1968 births
Living people
People from Vaprio d'Adda
Italian male cyclists
Olympic cyclists of Italy
Cyclists at the 1996 Summer Olympics
Cyclo-cross cyclists
Cross-country mountain bikers
Italian mountain bikers
Cyclists from the Metropolitan City of Milan